Alan Phillip Renouf OBE (21 March 1919 – 26 May 2008) was a prominent Australian government official during the 1970s.

Life and career
Renouf joined the Commonwealth Public Service in the Department of External Affairs in 1943, after serving in the army.

In 1960, Renouf was appointed the first Australian High Commissioner to Nigeria, a position in which he remained until 1963. Between 1963 and 1965, Renouf worked at the Australian embassy in Washington, D.C. He and his wife returned to Canberra for less than a year before Renouf was named Australia's first Ambassador to Yugoslavia in August 1966, to begin his appointment in November.

From 1969 to 1973, Renouf was Australia's Ambassador to France. In 1969, he was named Australia's first Ambassador to Portugal, with the intent that he would continue to reside in Paris. From 1974 to 1977, Renouf was the permanent head of the Australian Department of Foreign Affairs. During 1978 and 1979 he was the Australian Ambassador to the United States.

Renouf wrote at least three books: The Frightened Country (1979), Let Justice Be Done. The Foreign Policy of Dr H.V. Evatt (1983) and Malcolm Fraser and Australian Foreign Policy (1986).

Honours 
In 1965, Reonuf was appointed an Officer of the Order of the British Empire.

References

http://www.nla.gov.au/pub/gateways/archive/23/23.html
https://web.archive.org/web/20071022152004/http://unimelb.edu.au/malcolmfraser/publications/bibliography.html

Ambassadors of Australia to the United States
Australian Officers of the Order of the British Empire
1919 births
2008 deaths
Permanent Delegates of Australia to UNESCO
Ambassadors of Australia to France
Ambassadors of Australia to Portugal
Ambassadors of Australia to Yugoslavia
High Commissioners of Australia to Nigeria